The Tam Giang–Cau Hai lagoon (Vietnamese: Hệ đầm phá Tam Giang – Cầu Hai) is a coastal lagoon in Thua Thien Hue province, Central Vietnam. It has an area of 22,000 hectares of water surface and stretches nearly 70 kilometres, making it the largest lagoon system in Southeast Asia.

The lagoon system comprises several smaller lagoons, namely: Tam Giang, Thanh Lam, Sam Chuon, Ha Trung, Thuy Tu and Cau Hai. It has two inlets connecting to the South China Sea: Thuan An (in the centre) and Tu Hien (in the south). The depth of the lagoon is generally 1–3 metres, with the deepest site close to Thuan An inlet up to 11 metres.

References

Lagoons of Vietnam
Geography of Thừa Thiên Huế province